Kintele Aquatic Complex in Brazzaville Republic of the Congo. It is used for Swimming competitions. The venue was host to the swimming events of the 2015 African Games.

References  

Athletics (track and field) venues in the Republic of the Congo
Sports venues in the Republic of the Congo
Congo, Republic of
Stadiums of the African Games
Buildings and structures in Brazzaville
Sport in Brazzaville